This article is about the demographic features of the population of Japan before the Meiji Restoration.

Population before Edo era

Total population
Before the establishment of the religious and population investigation registers system by the Tokugawa shogunate, several less reliable sources existed upon which an estimate of the population was made. The first record of the population was the Chinese text "Records of Three Kingdoms"  where the summated number of houses in eight countries of Wō is given as 159,000.

The household registration system (Hukou or Huji), which is called  in Japanese, was introduced from ancient China to Japan during the 7th century. However, most of the original koseki texts were lost because they were to be preserved only 30 years. The oldest koseki fragments - which were reused as reinforcement papers in  - records names, ages and estates of people including slaves (e.g. 1,119 persons were recorded for the village named  (present day ) in 702)). The ancient koseki system later collapsed during the early Heian period, when aristocrats achieved power as landowners of Shōen.

The following estimates by different scholars are based upon the number of houses, villages, kokudaka, areas of rice fields and soldiers which were recorded in "" (10th century), "Record of Song or History of Song", "" (14th century), "" (late 16th century), "" (early 17th century), or fragments of papers of the Shōsōin (8th century) and others, as well as remnants of specific periods.

Urban population
Since Kyōto (or Heian-kyō) became the capital of Japan in 794, it has been one of the most important cities in Japan. Hiraizumi and Kamakura flourished under Northern Fujiwara clans (during 12th century) and Kamakura shogunate (1192 to 1333), respectively.  The urban area of Kyōto suffered from the Ōnin War (1467 to 1477) and split into two districts, but coalesced into a great city of more than 400,000 inhabitants after the end of Sengoku period. The Christian missionaries led by Francis Xavier reported that the number of houses in Kyōto, Yamaguchi or Hakata was more than 90,000, more than 10,000 or 10,000, respectively, in the late 16th century according to History of Japan written by Luís Fróis. After the unification of Japan by Toyotomi Hideyoshi, Ōsaka grew into a populous city with tens of thousands of people.  Several castle towns also began to grow, where samurai classes were settled.

Population during the  Edo and early Meiji eras (1600 to 1873)

Total population
After the Shimabara Rebellion, several daimyōs adopted certification systems where all the individuals were to be registered to temples and shrines to avoid Christianity.  The Danka system (or ) was officially set by Tokugawa shogunate in 1664, and demographic data of individuals registered to temples and shrines (Shūmon Ninbetsu Aratame Chō) were recorded. After decades, Tokugawa Yoshimune decided to survey the total population of Japan and ordered to collect demographic data of all the domains and shogunate territories. The first census was surveyed every six years since 1721 and finished in 1846, because the confusion after the Perry Expedition and death of Tokugawa Ieyoshi in 1853 postponed the calculation process of the demographic data collected in 1852, according to  edited by (.

Some of population censuses during Edo era remain recorded in diaries or official texts as below. The population of samurai class and their servants as well as imperial families and noblemen was officially excluded from the census. In addition, the demographic data were summarized by individual domains according to their rules, where babies and children, Buddhist monks, nuns and Shintō priests, discriminated classes of eta and hinin were sometimes excluded from the total population.  Unregistered people were also excluded.

In 1732, Tokugawa Yoshimune also ordered nine big Tozama daimyōs whose Domains were not changed since 1664 to report earlier population growths in their Domains. Here, population of Morioka Domain increased from 245,635 in 1669 to 322,109 in 1732; population of Tokushima Domain increased from 308,880 in 1665 to 470,512 in 1732; population of Tsu Domain increased from 252,061 in 1665 to 287,242 in 1732; population of Okayama Domain increased from 185,043 in 1686 to 396,469 in 1732; population of Kagoshima Domain increased from 260,961 in 1698 to 339,955 in 1732; population of Sendai Domain increased from 599,241 in 1690 to 647,427 in 1732; population of Tsuruoka Domain increased from 126,383 in 1694 to 131,164 in 1732; population of Kaga Domain increased from 551,754 in 1720 to 576,734 in 1732; while population of Nihonmatsu Domain only decreased from 73,351 in 1685 to 70,614 in 1732, according to the records written in "Chikkyō Yohitsu Besshū", which supports the rapid population growth in the early Edo era.

Total Fertility Rate from 1800 to 1873
The total fertility rate is the number of children born per woman. It is based on approximated and fairly good data for the entire period. Sources: Our World In Data and Gapminder Foundation.

Regional population

Former provinces
Some demographic data for former provinces or  remain recorded. Similarly to the total population, recorded provincial population excludes ruling and exceptional classes, while that in 1873 (after Meiji Restoration) includes all the registered people.

After the beginning of the Tokugawa census, population growth fell almost to zero until the end of the Sakoku policy. On the other hand, regional demographic data suggest that population growth differed depending on area; the population of Tōhoku region (Mutsu and Dewa), especially in Mutsu decreased drastically, probably because of famines. The population of Kansai region (Kinai and its surrounding areas), which was the most densely populated and the most cultivated area of that time, as well as that of Kantō region, also slightly decreased, probably because the surplus population in the rural areas moved to the big cities such as Kyoto, Osaka, and Edo, where the life expectancy at birth were much lower than that in rural areas. On the other hand, populations in most of western Japan including Chūgoku region (San'indō and San'yodō), Shikoku (Nankaidō except for Kii) and Kyūshū (Saikaidō) steadily increased, where growth was sustained by the introduction of New World crops such as sweet potato, pumpkin, or corn.

Ryūkyū, Amami, Ezo and Karafuto
The populations of Ryūkyū and Amami Islands were surveyed by the Satsuma Domain, which had formal possession of Satsuma, Ōsumi and part of Hyūga in southern Kyūshū, and recorded in Satsuma domestic texts, although they were not reported to the Tokugawa shogunate and were thus excluded from the total population of Japan. The populations of Ryūkyū and Amami Islands were included in the total populations of Japan after the Meiji Restoration.

The populations recorded in Satsuma domestic texts include all the classes, from several samurai classes to people who were discriminated against.

On the other hand, the populations of Ainu in eastern Ezo (including Chishima (Kuril Islands)) and western Ezo (including Karafuto (Sakhalin)) have been recorded since 1798 and 1810, respectively, and were thus included in the total population of Japan.

Domains (han) and estates of the realm
Meiji government tried to unify the registered system of Shūmon Ninbetsu Aratame Chō in consonant with that of each other among domains and prefectures into a single registered system of koseki. However population were still surveyed by domains until the Abolition of the han system in 1871. The total population of Japan on July 28, 1870 (32,773,698) was collected by different systems of domains, but included all the registered people of all classes.

Urban population
After the Battle of Sekigahara, Yamaguchi declined, while Edo (Tōkyō) and Sumpu (Shizuoka) became important under the Tokugawa shogunate. According to Rodrigo de Vivero y Velasco, the populations of Kyōto, Ōsaka, Edo, Sumpu and Sakai were 300,000–400,000 (or 800,000), 200,000, 150,000, 120,000 and 80,000, respectively, while the two towns between Sumpu and Kyōto had 30,000 and 40,000 inhabitants (probably Hamamatsu and Nagoya (or Kiyosu), respectively) in 1609.

Below is a list of the estimated population of major Japanese urbans during Edo period. Although Hiroshima, Wakayama, Tokushima, Hagi, Takamatsu and Sumpu (Shizuoka) were important castle towns of major domains, estimated populations are not given because of the lack of sufficient demographic records. Population of Shuri, the capital of the Kingdom of Ryūkyū, is also not estimated, while Yokohama was only a small village of less than 100 houses until the opening of the port in 1859.

Estimated populations of castle towns contain considerable errors compared to those of the business towns (Ōsaka, Sakai, Hyōgo, Niigata, Nagasaki, Hakodate and Fushimi) with fewer samurai-class inhabitants, because demographics of samurai classes and their servants (or dwellers of samurai districts) were recorded separately or kept secret, which easily lead to the loss of original data after the abolition of the Han system.  On the other hand, the demography of chōnin classes (civilian), or dwellers of chōnin districts plus chōnin classes who dwelt in temple/shrine districts (i.e. excluding demographics of Buddhist monks, nuns and Shintō priests which were usually summed separately), rather remain recorded for most of the cases.

Even the peak estimated population of Edo varies from 788,000 to 1,500,000.  For example, Yoshida (1910) estimated the peak population of Edo (shortly before Perry's expeditions) at 1,400,000 based on the average amount of rice carried into Edo (1,400,000 koku per year).  Chandler (1987) estimated the peak population of Edo at 788,000 by adding samurai population as 3/8 of the recorded chōnin population.  Sekiyama (1958) estimated the peak population of Edo at 1,100,000 by adding samurai and servants population as 500,000 (215,000 Hatamoto, Gokenin, their servants and families, 100,000 shōguns Ashigaru, other lower servants and their families, 180,000 Daimyo, their servants and their families).  Diaries recorded that the population of Edo was 1,287,800 in 1837, the population of monks and priests was ca. 40,000 or the samurai population of Edo was 700,973.  According to the map of Edo illustrated in 1725, area for samurai occupied 66.4% of the total area of Edo (estimated population density: 13,988 /km2 for 650,000 individuals), while areas for chōnin and temples-shrines occupied 12.5% (estimated chōnin population density: 68,807 /km2 for 600,000 individuals) and 15.4% (estimated population density: 4,655 /km2 for 50,000 individuals), respectively.

Selected recorded populations of urbans listed above are as follows. Sources for koseki censuses are given in Japanese Wikipedia page.
 Edo: 353,588 (chōnin, in 6th month of 1693); 501,394 (chōnin, in 11th month of 1721); 533,763 (chōnin, in 4th month of 1734); 509,708 (chōnin, 7,442 eta–hinin excluded, in 12th month of 1750); 457,083 (chōnin, in 1786); 492,449 (chōnin, in 5th month of 1798); 545,623 (chōnin, in 5th month of 1832); 587,458 (553,257 registered plus 34,201 temporal chōnin, in 7 month of 1843); 569,549 (559,115 registered plus 10,434 temporal chōnin, 10,008 eta–hin excluded, in 4th month of 1850); 584,166 (575,091 registered plus 9,075 temporal chōnin, in 9th month of 1853); 543,079 (538,463 registered plus 4,616 temporal chōnin, in 9th month of 1867); 674,447 (all classes, as of 1st day of 1st month in 1869). Recorded populations of Yoshiwara girls (8,679), Buddhist monks in temples (36,695), Buddhist monks outside temples (4,277), Shintō priests in shrines (5,843), Buddhist nuns (6,722), Shintō priests outside shrines (5,831), the blind (1,284) in 1743.
 Ōsaka: 279,610 (chōnin, in 1625); 252,446 (chōnin, in 1661); 364,154 (chōnin, in 1699); 383,480 (382,471 chōnin plus 1,009 monks in 1721); 404,146 (chōnin and monks, in 1749); 419,863 (chōnin and monks, 3,590 eta excluded, in 1765); 379,121 (chōnin and monks, 4,423 eta excluded, in 1800); 369,173 (chōnin and monks, 5,122 eta excluded, in 1832); 330,637 (chōnin and monks, 4,450 eta excluded, in 1850); 301,093 (chōnin and monks, in 1862); 281,306 (all classes, in 1868). Present town of Ōsaka began from a temple town of Ishiyama Hongan-ji, where 2,000 houses were reported in 1562. On the other hand, number of houses for Tennnōji, a temple town of Shitennō-ji, was described as 7,000 in 1499. Ōsaka and Tenōji were connected by a suburb town of Hirano: 10,851 (chōnin, in 1688); 10,991 (chōnin, in 1690); 9,272 (chōnin, in 1702); 9,439 (chōnin, 100 eta excluded, in 1756); 8,142 (chōnin, 124 eta excluded, in 1799); 7,958 (chōnin, 246 eta excluded, in 1850), 7,948 (chōnin, 253 eta excluded, in 1863). Both Tennōji and Namba were suburb towns of Ōsaka with estimated populations of ca. 10,000 during Edo era.  The history of Namba or Naniwa is much older; estimated population of Naniwa was 35,000 during Nara period.
 Kyōto: 410,089 (chōnin in chōnin districts, Rakuchū (inside walls), in 1634); 362,322 (chōnin in chōnin districts, Rakuchū, in 1661); 408,723 (chōnin (372,810 in chōnin districts, Rakuchū plus 35,918 in chōnin districts, Rakugai (outside walls)), in 1674); 388,142 (chōnin (321,449 in chōnin districts, Rakuchū; 32,258 in chōnin districts, Rakugai; 6,611 in temples and shrines, Rakuchū; 27,824 in temples and shrines, Rakugai), in 1683; 372,972 (chōnin (317,936 in chōnin districts, Rakuchū; 33,756 in chōnin districts, Rakugai; 2,780 in temples and shrines, Rakuchū; 18,500 in temples and shrines, Rakugai), in 1700); 374,449 (chōnin (345,882 in chōnin districts, Rakuchū plus 28,567 in chōnin districts, Rakugai), in 1729); 318,016 (chōnin (255,947 in chōnin districts, Rakuchū plus 62,069 in chōnin districts, Rakugai), in 1766); 237,674 (all classes, in 1871).  The urban areas of Kyōto and Fushimi were connected by built-up area by 19th century.
 Nagoya: 54,932 (chōnin, in 1654); 63,734 (chōnin, in 1692); 55,665 (chōnin, in 1694); 42,135 (chōnin, in 1721); 73,583 (chōnin, in 1750); 75,779 (chōnin, in 1840); 73,963 (chōnin, 757 doctors and 103 rōnin included, in 1865); 71,698 (69,618 chōnin plus 860 doctors, monks and priests, in 1871).
 Kanazawa: 55,106 (chōnin, in 1664); 68,636 (chōnin, in 1697); 64,987 (chōnin, in 1710); 56,355 (chōnin, in 1810); 58,506 (chōnin, in 1857); 60,789 (chōnin, in 1869); 123,363 (all classes including 26,038 upper samurai, 26,888 lower samurai, 68,810 commons, 139 priests, 1,032 monks and 456 convicts, in 1871).
 Kagoshima: 49,096 (all classes in gō of Kagoshima, in 1684); 59,816 (all classes in gō of Kagoshima, 15,176 upper samurai, 27,725 lower samurai, 318 monks, 5,737 chōnin in main three towns, 104 chōnin in Yokoi town, 123 fisherfolks, 10,382 farmers and 89 discriminated, in 1772); 61,507 (all classes in gō of Kagoshima, 15,728 upper samurai, 28,113 lower samurai, 289 monks, 5,185 chōnin in main three towns, 115 chōnin in Yokoi town, 98 fisherfolks, 11,954 farmers and 25 discriminated, in 1800); 76,998 (all classes in gō of Kagoshima, 18,171 upper samurai, 39,922 lower samurai, 303 monks, 4,040 chōnin in main three towns, 129 chōnin in Yokoi town, 66 fisherfolks, 14,281 farmers and 86 discriminated, in 1852); 85,435 (all classes in gō of Kagoshima, 26,992 upper samurai, 2,671 lower samurai and 55,872 commons, in 1871). Population as of Jan 1, 1873 (27,240): only those living in chōnin districts.
 Hiroshima: 37,212 (36,142 chōnin plus 1,070 monks, in 1663); 48,351 (37,155 chōnin, 10,855 in suburb and 341 discriminated, in 1715); 33,191 (chōnin, in 1746); 29,247 (chōnin, in 1800); 50,092 (24,776 chōnin, 23,884 in suburb and 1,432 discriminated, in 1822).
 Yokohama: 88 houses (ca. 450 persons) in 1840.
 Wakayama: 42,314 (chōnin over 7 years old, in 1699); 57,005 (chōnin of all ages, in 1700 or 1728).
 Sendai: 25,590 (22,706 chōnin, 631 monks and 2,253 in temples district, in 1695); 26,623 (20,374 chōnin, 863 monks and 5,386 in temples district, in 1742); 15,617 (11,610 chōnin, 594 monks and 3,413 in temples district in 1772); 17,798 (13,302 chōnin, 652 monks and 3,840 in temples district, in 1802); 18,444 (13,749 chōnin, 710 monks and 3,985 in temples district, in 1825).
 Tokushima: 18,826 (chōnin in 1670); 20,590 (chōnin in 1685).
 Hagi: 5,300 (chōnin, in 1667); 12,260 (chōnin, in 1707); 14,633 (chōnin, in 1716); 10,791 (chōnin, in 1789); 16,424 (chōnin, in 1817/1818).
 Shuri: 8,455 (2,322 samurai plus 6,133 commons, in 1654); 16,210 (4,492 samurai plus 11,718 commons, in 1691); 20,861 (9,612 samurai plus 11,249 commons, in 1729).
 Toyama: 16,000 (chōnin, in 1661); 23,903 (7,603 samurai plus 16,210 chōnin, in 1676); 17,600 (chōnin, in ca 1700); 20,000 (chōnin, in 1761); 34,228 (6,840 samurai plus 27,388 chōnin, in 1810); 26,936 (chōnin, in 1841).
 Kumamoto: 12,841 (samurai included, in 1611); 24,735 (chōnin, in ca. 1680); 19,939 (chōnin, in 1734); 20,881 (chōnin, in 1754); 18,470 (chōnin, in 1798); 21,300 (chōnin, in 1830).
 Hyōgo: 19,766 (chōnin, in ca. 1725); 21,030 (chōnin, in 1759); 22,774 (chōnin, in 1769); 20,853 (chōnin, in 1800); 20,942 (chōnin, in 1832); 21,861 (chōnin, in 1850); 27,476 (all classes, as of Jan 1, 1873).  Kōbe: 1,391 (chōnin, in 1690); 1,985 (chōnin, in 1760); 2,637 (chōnin, in 1830); 2,547 (chōnin, in 1850); 8,554 (all classes, as of Jan 1, 1873). Sudden increase in population began in 1869, when the Port of Kōbe was opened to foreigners, while the port of Hyōgo was already one of the important ports of Japan for domestic transport.
 Hakata: 17,948 (chōnin, in 1669); 19,468 (chōnin, in 1690); 17,842 (chōnin, in 1718); 15,448 (chōnin, in 1750); 14,619 (chōnin, in 1812); 20,985 (all classes, as of Jan 1, 1873). Fukuoka: 15,009 (chōnin, in 1690); 13,675 (chōnin, in 1718); 7,470 (chōnin, in 1806); 20,650 (all classes, as of Jan 1, 1873). Hakata was already an important port since 12th century. On the other hand, Fukuoka area was built as a new castle town of the Fukuoka domain in 1600, named after a place in Setouchi, Okayama where the Kuroda clans grew.
 Fukui: 25,331 (chōnin, in ca. 1610); 21,393 (chōnin, in 1712); 20,533 (chōnin, in 1750); 18,364 (chōnin, in 1792); 32,613 (12,832 samurai plus 19,781 chōnin, in 1847).
 Kōchi: 17,054 (chōnin, in 1665); 21,351 (5,693 samurai plus 14,658 chōnin, in 1762); 13,985 (chōnin, in 1819); 15,895 (chōnin, in 1852).
 Sakai: 69,368 (chōnin, in 1663); 56,997 (chōnin, in 1703); 47,928 (chōnin, in 1746); 44,496 (chōnin, in 1813); 40,977 (chōnin, in 1848); 37,153 (chōnin, in 1859). Sakai was an important port during Muromachi period. 10,000 houses in 1399.
 Kubota: 20,828 (chōnin, 15,257 in Kubora and 5,571 in Minato (present Tsuchizaki area in Akita), in 1730); 21,313 (chōnin both in Kubota and Minato, in 1747); 16,387 (chōnin, 11,450 in Kubota and 4,937 in Minato, in 1844); 16,990 (chōnin both in Kubota and Mianto, in 1850); 18,082 (chōnin both in Kubota and Mianto, in 1859); 46,677 (all classes, 38,118 in Akita and 8,559 in Tuchizaki-minato, as of Jan 1, 1873).
 Matsue: 28,564 (15,019 samurai plus 13,545 chōnin, in 1761); 29,263 (15,268 samurai plus 13,995 chōnin, in 1787); 31,161 (15,635 samurai plus 15,526 chōnin, in 1787); 36,073 (15,567 samurai plus 20,506 chōnin, in 1838).
 Niigata: 2,500 houses (chōnin, in 1697); 20,800–20,900 (chōnin, in 1818), 25,467 (chōnin, in 1850).
 Hirosaki: 17,362 (chōnin, in 1694); 31,200 (14,600 samurai plus 16,600 chōnin; in 1765); 26,730 (samurai and chōnin, in 1800); 36,036 (21,004 samurai, 14,540 chōnin, 492 monks and priests, in 1837); 14,850 (chōnin, in 1858); 38,848 (21,926 samurai plus 16,922 chōnin, in 1866).
 Takamatsu: 12,943 (chōnin, in 1642); 24,243 (chōnin, in 1667); 30,195 (5,273 samurai and 24,922 chōnin, in 1838).
 Okayama: 28,669 (chōnin, in 1667); 30,635 (chōnin, in 1707); 24,556 (chōnin, in 1753); 21,357 (chōnin, in 1798); 20,086 (chōnin, in 1854); 20,670 (chōnin, in 1869).
 Sumpu: 17,067 (chōnin, in 1692); 16,163 (chōnin, in 1762); 15,724 (chōnin, in 1850).
 Nagasaki: 24,693 (chōnin, in 1616); 40,700 (chōnin, in 1659); 53,522 (chōnin, in 1694); 50,148 (chōnin, in 1703); 41,553 (chōnin, in 1715); 29,897 (chōnin, in 1771), 31,893 (chōnin, in 1789); 29,962 (chōnin, in 1841); 27,343 (chōnin, in 1853); 27,381 (chōnin, in 1856).
 Hakodate: 2,595 (chōnin, in 1801); 9,480 (637 samurai, 8,682 chōnin, plus 161 monks and priests, in 1850); 18,609 (all classes including temporal residents, 14,660 permanent residents, in 1867).
 Takada: 21,567 (chōnin, in 1681); 17,429 (chōnin, in 1701); 15,832 (chōnin, in 1741); 18,383 (chōnin, in 1838); 17,906 (chōnin, in 1843); 19,060 (chōnin, in 1869).
 Matsuyama: 16,604 (chōnin, in 1691); 11,528 (chōnin, in 1789); 11,598 (chōnin, in 1820).
 Tsuruoka: 7,837 (chōnin, in 1667); 10,951 (chōnin, in 1700); 17,705 (9,206 samurai plus 8,499 chōnin, in 1770); 8,406 (chōnin, in 1840).
 Yonezawa: 6,207 (chōnin, in 1595); 12,129 (chōnin, in 1692); 11,481 (chōnin, in 1701); 16,099 (chōnin, in 1776); 6,667 (chōnin, in 1840); 6,920 (chōnin, in 1850); 6,943 (chōnin, in 1862).
 Himeji: 22,125 (chōnin, in 1648); 24,140 (chōnin, in 1667); 21,526 (chōnin, in ca. 1700); 18,769 (chōnin, in 1749); 14,725 (chōnin, in 1809); 13,872 (chōnin, in 1845).
 Hikone: 15,505 (chōnin, in 1695); 15,675 (chōnin, in ca. 1802); 13,162 (chōnin, in 1869).
 Nagaoka: 5,781 (chōnin, in 1694).
 Takaoka: 13,085 (chōnin, in 1699); 10,681 (chōnin, in 1761); 15,582 (chōnin, in 1771); 15,465 (chōnin, in 1785); 12,037 (chōnin, in 1816).
 Yamada: 23,622 (chōnin over 14 years old, in 1627); 30,929 (chōnin, in 1629); 39,621 (chōnin in 1717). Uji: 3,592 (chōnin, in 1629).
 Fushimi: 25,249 (chōnin, in 1690); 28,743 (chōnin, in 1700); 27,450 (chōnin, in ca. 1770); 33,385 (chōnin, in ca. 1786); 40,980 (chōnin, in ca. 1843).  The urban areas of Kyōto and Fushimi were connected by built-up area by 19th century.
 Annōtsu: 12,205 (chōnin, in 1665); 12,261 (chōnin, in 1666); 11,648 (chōnin, in 1701); 11,262 (chōnin, in 1731); 7,170 (chōnin, males over 15 years old plus females over 13 years old, in 1759).
 Saga: 31,450 (13,451 samurai plus 17,999 chōnin, in 1687); 20,084 (6,373 samurai plus 13,711 chōnin, in 1854).
 Morioka: 12,324 (chōnin, in 1683); 14,209 (chōnin, in 1700); 15,726 (chōnin, in 1750); 17,941 (chōnin, in 1798); 18,824 (chōnin, in 1803); 17,966 (chōnin, in 1840)
 Nara: 34,985 (25,054 chōnin plus 9,931 in temples and shrines districts, in 1631); 28,243 (chōnin, in 1680); 35,369 (26,420 chōnin plus 8,949 in temples and shrines districts, in 1698); 23,500 (chōnin, in 1714); 22,538 (chōnin, in 1726); 22,146 (chōnin, in 1729); 20,081 (chōnin, in 1740); 19,210 (chōnin, in 1744); 20,661 (16,004 chōnin plus 5,657 in temples and shrines districts, in 1857).
 Tottori: population of chōnin: 13,125 (chōnin, in 1749); 10,228 (chōnin, in 1810); 11,440 (chōnin, in 1846).
 Wakamatsu: population of chōnin: 18,435 (in 1666); 20,700 (in 1697);16,700 (in 1718); 11,670 (in 1788).
 Kurume: population of chōnin: 8,764 (in 1699); 8,888 (in 1706); 7,631 (in 1780); 8,632 (in 1822); 11,208 (in 1858).
 Kuwana: population of chōnin: 12,520 (in 1679); 13,160 (in ca. 1700); 11,902 (in 1710); 10,857 (in 1750); 8,527 (in 1822), 8,848 (in 1843).
 Ōtsu: population of chōnin: 18,774 (in 1691); 17,810 (in 1699); 17,568 (in 1714); 17,481 (in 1719); 16,072 (in 1766); 14,950 (in 1783); 14,892 (in 1843).
 Yamagata: population of chōnin: 13,981 (chōnin, in 1622); 13,507 (in 1697); 17,508 (in 1738); 12,586 (in 1746); 15,214 (in 1753).
 Kōfu: population of chōnin: 12,772 (in 1670); 14,334 (1689); 13,539 (in 1697); 12,699 (in 1705); 13,306 (in 1710); 9,290 (in 1724); 9,566 (in 1806); 11,071 (chōnin, in 1864).
 Tsuruga: population of chōnin: 15,101 (in 1663); 11,345 (in 1679); 13,568 (in 1681); 10,600 (in 1726); 11,506 (in 1729); 8,900 (chōnin, in 1840); 12,296 (in 1854).
 Ōgaki: population of chōnin: 5,543 (in 1721); 5,343 (in 1785); 5,522 (in 1837); 5,097 (in 1843).

See also 
Demography of Imperial Japan
Demography of Japan
Japanese people

References

Books 
 Takahashi, Bonsen, "", Sanyūsha, Tokyo:Japan, 1941.
 Sekiyama, Naotarō, "", Yoshikawa Kōbunkan, Tokyo:Japan, 1958.
 Hayami, Akira, ed., "", Hara Shobō, Tokyo:Japan, 1992.
Historical censuses of provinces during Edo era summarized by Hayami is also given in the following paper:
 Hayami, Akira, "Chronology of Population Statistics in Early Meiji Japan", Nihon Bunka, (9), pp. 135–164 (1993).

External links
 Digital Archives, National Archives of Japan (original texts in Japanese)
 Shokoku Ninzūchō (from Zassai vol. 25; total and provincial demographics of Japan as of 1792 (Kansei 4) and 1798 (Kansei 10) perfectly recorded)
National Diet Library Digital Collections (original texts in Japanese)
 Japan Registered Population Tables as of January 1, 1874
 Kotenseki sogo database (Japanese & Chinese Classics) at Waseda University (original texts in Japanese)
 Kanchū Hisaku (Codex in Japanese with the year of An'ei 4 (1776); total and provincial demographics of Japan as of 1750 (Kan'en 3) recorded)
 Kokudaka and population Table (Okuma Shigenobu Collection, demographics of domains and prefectures as of February 2, 1869 (1st day of the 1st month, Meiji 2) recorded)
Statistics Bureau of Japan

Demographics of Japan
Demographic history of Japan
Japan